1995–96 Croatian First A League was the fifth season of the Croatian handball league since its independence.

League table

Sources 
 Fredi Kramer, Dražen Pinević: Hrvatski rukomet = Croatian handball, Zagreb, 2009.; page. 178
 Kruno Sabolić: Hrvatski športski almanah 1996/1997, Zagreb, 1997.

External links
EHF 
Croatian Handball Federation

1995-96
handball
handball
Croatia